Anjali Sharma may refer to:
 Anjali Sharma (cricketer)
 Anjali Sharma (climate activist)